The Rockhampton colonial by-election, 1870 was a by-election held on 20 June 1870 in the electoral district of Rockhampton for the Queensland Legislative Assembly.

History
On 7 June 1870, Henry Milford, member for Rockhampton since the by-election in December 1870, resigned, having never taken his seat in Parliament. Milford contested the resulting by-election on 20 June 1870, but was defeated by Alexander Fyfe.

See also
 Members of the Queensland Legislative Assembly, 1868–1870

References

1870 elections in Australia
Queensland state by-elections
1870s in Queensland